Gëzim Krasniqi (born 5 January 1990) is an Albanian professional footballer who plays as a defender for Albanian club KF Egnatia.

Club career
He previously played for Partizani Tirana in the Albanian Superliga.

On 12 January 2018, Krasniqi moved for the first time abroad and signed with Macedonian First Football League side Rabotnički. He was presented four days later along with three other players, penning a contract until the end of the season. Krasniqi's spell was short-lived, as he was released in May 2018 after collecting 10 league appearances.

On 22 August 2018, Krasniqi signed a one-year contract with Kukësi.

Honours
Besa Kavajë

Albanian Cup: 2009–10
Albanian Supercup: 2010

References

External links

1990 births
Living people
Footballers from Kavajë
Albanian footballers
Association football defenders
Besa Kavajë players
FK Partizani Tirana players
Flamurtari Vlorë players
FK Rabotnički players
FK Kukësi players
KS Egnatia Rrogozhinë players
Kategoria Superiore players
Kategoria e Parë players
Macedonian First Football League players
Albanian expatriate footballers
Expatriate footballers in North Macedonia
Albanian expatriate sportspeople in North Macedonia